Abdullah Öztürk (born October 1, 1989) is a Turkish para table tennis player of class 4 and Paralympian.

Öztürk represented his country at the 2012 Summer Paralympics in London, United Kingdom.

In 2014, he won the silver medal along with Ali Öztürk and Nesim Turan      in the Team C5 event at the World Para Table Tennis Championships in Beijing, China.

He took the gold medal with his teammates Ali Öztürk and Nesim Turan in the Team C4 event at the 2016 Lignano Master Open in Italy. He captured the gold medal in the individual C4 event at the 2016 Summer Paralympics in Rio de Janeiro, Brazil. He won the bronze medal in the Team C4–5 event of the Paralympics along with his brother Ali Öztürk and teammate Nesim Turan.

As of April 2019, Öztürk ranks second in the world list of his disability class.

He won the gold medal in the Individual C4 event at the 2020 Summer Paralympics.

References

Living people
1989 births
Sportspeople from Ankara
Turkish male table tennis players
Paralympic table tennis players of Turkey
Table tennis players at the 2012 Summer Paralympics
Table tennis players at the 2016 Summer Paralympics
Medalists at the 2016 Summer Paralympics
Paralympic medalists in table tennis
Paralympic gold medalists for Turkey
Paralympic bronze medalists for Turkey
Table tennis players at the 2020 Summer Paralympics
Medalists at the 2020 Summer Paralympics
21st-century Turkish people